Lee Wells (born 1971) is an artist, independent curator, and a technology and art consultant based New York.  He is a co-founder of Peanut Underground Art Projects in New York. He is a co-founder and director of IFAC-arts, and a co-founder of Perpetual art machine, [PAM]. He helped curate the 2011 exhibition,  No Comment, in New York City where one of his installations was also shown.

References

External links
 Biography
 Biography on IFAC Arts

American artists
1971 births
Living people
People from Granville, Ohio